Celestia Susannah Parrish (September 12, 1853 – September 7, 1918) was an American educator.

She was born the daughter of a plantation owner, William Perkins Parrish (1816-1863), and Lucinda Jane Walker (1828-1863), on September 12, 1853, in Pittsylvania County, Virginia. Her father was a plantation owner of moderate wealth and position.  He supported her intellectual ambitions. At age 5 she attended a private school on the plantation.  Her parents died during the Civil War leaving her, her younger brother, and her sister to live with their uncle and two aunts. She was orphaned by age 10 and was taken under the care of relatives until her uncle's death five years later. Her uncle disapproved of girls receiving an education so she read all the books in her aunt's library.  In 1865 she attended a private school in Callands, Virginia.  At that point, she took up a job as a community schoolteacher to support her younger brother and her sister but struggled with her early teaching experiences.

Parrish's early life was difficult, but she was determined to support her family and to obtain an education for herself. Her guardian uncle died and her aunts refused to support her and her siblings. In 1874, she accepted a position as a teacher in Danville, Virginia which allowed her to begin taking classes at Roanoke Female College with her younger sister. She taught from 1871 to 1875. In 1876, she graduated but went on to take two more years of schooling at the Virginia State Normal School.

In 1892, Parrish had gained a significant reputation for her teaching and was offered a position at the newly opened Randolph-Macon Woman's College in Lynchburg, Virginia as the chair of mathematics. Under this position, she was also responsible for philosophy, pedagogy, and psychology. In order to gain a better understanding of the field of psychology, she enrolled in a summer session at Cornell University in Ithaca, New York to study under the famous American psychologist E. B. Titchener. Although Titchener is known as a rigid sexist (no women were permitted to join his Society for Experimental Psychology), he did accept a number of female graduate students, including Parrish.

After Parrish returned to Randolph-Macon, Titchener initially refused to do any correspondence work with her. She begged him to change his mind, urging him that "you must help me. A man who sits down to the rich feasts which are spread before you has no right to deny a few crumbs to a poor starveling like me (Parrish, 1925, p. 3)." Titchener relented and the two eventually became good friends.

Writings

Her efforts were rewarded when she achieved a publication in 1895 in The American Journal of Psychology with Titchener titled "Minor studies from the psychological laboratory of Cornell university: VII the cutaneous estimation of open and filled spaces". This study had seven subjects, two of which were Mr. and Mrs. Titchener.

Her second publication with Titchener titled "Minor Studies from the Psychological Laboratory of Cornell University: Localization of cutaneous impressions by arm movement without pressure upon the skin." was also published in The American Journal of Psychology in 1897. This work, largely inspired by Pillsbury and Washburn, added to the relevant information during that time of localization and perception of feeling on the skin.

Impact and legacy
Parrish's work with Titchener inspired her to follow more of an experimental approach in her work. She approached the President of Randolph-Macon for $25 in order to set up a psychology lab in Lynchburg, Virginia. Due to Parrish's hard work, determination and love for teaching, she opened up the "first psychology laboratory in the south". This act definitely put Parrish on the map as a very notable psychologist. Accomplishing such a prestigious monument as a prejudiced woman in academia is very admirable.

Parrish stayed at Randolph-Macon until 1902 when she moved to teach at State Normal School of Georgia in Athens. Again, she established a psychology lab at this university, largely donated by George Peabody. She was in charge of the lab and taught courses (some in child psychology) until 1911 when she became the State Supervisor of Schools in Georgia, which she remained as until her death in 1918. As State Supervisor she was in charge of thousands and more than 3,800 teachers. She traveled frequently training teachers and campaigning for money for schools to ensure the best possible education. She traveled to the 2,400 rural schools by buggy and wagon around back roads in all 48 counties of North Georgia.

She died September 7, 1918, in Clayton, Georgia.  Her funeral was at Clayton Baptist Church and her monument bears the inscription "Georgia's Greatest Woman" bestowed upon her by the Georgia State Superintendent of Schools. She is buried at the Clayton Baptist Church, Rabun County, Georgia.

As a highly educated woman during a time that did not appreciate such a thing, Celestia Parrish accomplished many amazing feats. She established two psychology laboratories, one being the first in the region, influencing and moving towards a field of psychology that is more focused on experimentalism. She taught university level classes at a time when women were not even allowed to attend university and invested an incredible amount of time to Georgia's educational system. She was truly an inspiring woman both in the field of psychology and in life, as noted on her epitaph which reads: "Georgia's Greatest Woman".

References

Sources and further reading
 
 

American women psychologists
Cornell University alumni
People from Pittsylvania County, Virginia
1853 births
1918 deaths